Fiete im Netz is an East German film. It was released in 1958.

External links
 

1958 films
East German films
1950s German-language films
German children's films
Films based on children's books
1950s children's films
1950s German films